Cercle d'Éducation Physique de Lorient, commonly known as CEP Lorient, is a French basketball club based in Lorient. The team currently plays in the Nationale Masculine 1, the national third tier league. Established in 1934, the team gained its professional status in 1984.

History
In August 2016, Icelandic international Michael Craion signed with Lorient and averaged 17.7 points and 7.8 rebounds.

Honours
Nationale Masculine 1 (French Third League)
Champions (1): 1950–51
Runners-up (1): 2017–18

Notable players

References

Basketball teams in France
Lorient
Basketball teams established in 1934